Frances Carpenter, Countess of Tyrconnel (24 March 1753 – 15 October 1792) was an English noblewoman.

Life
Manners was born in 1753. She was the daughter of John Manners, Marquess of Granby and his wife Lady Frances Seymour.

She was herself the wife of George Carpenter, 2nd Earl of Tyrconnel. They married on 9 July 1772 and had one child, Susanna Carpenter (died 1827). Manners eloped with the artist and sporting celebrity Charles Loraine Smith. The elopement was cited in her divorce in 1777. She remarried on 27 October 1777 to Philip Anstruther.

References

External links
The Peerage

1753 births
1792 deaths
Tyrconnell
F